The Legislative Assembly of Primorsky Krai is the regional parliament of Primorsky Krai, a federal subject of Russia. A total of 40 deputies are elected for five-year terms.

The assembly exercises its authority by passing laws, resolutions, and other legal acts and by supervising the implementation and observance of the laws and other legal acts passed by it.

Elections

2021

List of chairmen

References 

Politics of Primorsky Krai
Primorsky Krai